Lake Güija is a lake in Central America. The lake is situated on the border between Guatemala and El Salvador and has an area of 45 km2, of which approximately 32 km2 lies in El Salvador.

The lake is of volcanic origin and was formed by a large basaltic lava flow from Volcán de San Diego in the San Diego volcanic field which blocked the Güija depression's original drainage. Lake Güija is fed by the Ostúa, Angue and Cusmapa rivers and is drained on its southeastern side by the río Desagüe, a tributary of the río Lempa. The lake is surrounded by the volcanic cones of the Mita, San Diego and Cerro Quemado. The Salvadoran side of the lake has several small isles: Teotipa, Cerro de Tule and Iguatepec, where a substantial number of pre-Columbian céramics have been discovered since excavations started in 1924.
Bosque San Diego La Barra lies on the eastern side of the lake.

World Heritage Status 
This site was added to the UNESCO World Heritage Tentative List on September 21, 1992, in the Mixed (Cultural + Natural) category.

References

External links
 Lago de Güija
 San Diego Volcano
 Tentative list UNESCO World Heritage Sites
 Metapán

Guija
Guija
El Salvador–Guatemala border
Guija
Ramsar sites in El Salvador
Geography of the Jutiapa Department
Güija